Canada and the Republic of China (also known as Taiwan) have maintained unofficial bilateral relations since 1970.

Relations between Canada and the ROC were established in 1942. Since Canada's recognition of the People's Republic of China as the sole representative of "China" in 1970, there are no ambassadorial relations between Canada and Taiwan due to the Chinese government's One-China policy, but there are strong ties of trade and culture between the two entities since at least 1986. Officially, Canada "takes note" of China's claim to Taiwan without endorsing or challenging this position.

History

Prior to the Communist takeover

In 1942, Canada posted its first ambassador for the Republic of China (the successor state to the Qing dynasty) in the wartime capital of Chongqing. The embassy was then moved to the permanent capital of Nanjing in 1946. However, with the Communist victory over the Nationalists, which caused them to retreat to Taiwan, formerly a Qing prefecture that was under Japanese dominion for 50 years, while the Communists established the People's Republic of China, the Canadian embassy in Nanjing was kept open until February 26, 1951. While Canada maintained its diplomatic relations with Nationalist China on Taiwan, Japan officially relinquished the claims to Taiwan and Penghu upon the signing of the Treaty of San Francisco on April 28, 1952.

Policy
On 13 October 1970, Canada recognized People's Republic of China (PRC) and suspended diplomatic relations with the Republic of China (ROC) in Taiwan. In the United Nations General Assembly Resolution 2758 Canada supported the People's Republic of China (PRC) as the successor state of the Republic of China. After diplomatic relations between Canada and the ROC were suspended, both diplomatic missions were replaced by representative offices.

Presently, the Government of the Republic of China maintains the Taipei Economic and Cultural Office in Canada in Ottawa, and two other offices in Vancouver and Toronto. Taiwan External Trade Development Council also has offices in Toronto and Vancouver.

The Government of Canada established the Canadian Trade Office in Taipei (CTOT) in 1986 during the days of Brian Mulroney. During the mandate of Stephen Harper the CTOT expanded and moved to the Xinyi District of Taipei.

In October 2019, Stephen Harper visited Taipei as a private citizen to attend the Yushan Forum, promote his book, Right Here, Right Now, and give a speech that was described as a "thinly-veiled criticism of China's economic model" by the Globe and Mail. Victor Gao, vice president of the Chinese-government-aligned Center for China and Globalization, disapproved of Harper's visit.

Economic
In 2019, Taiwan was reportedly the fifth-largest trading partner in Asia of Canada. The main exports from Canada to Taiwan are metal ore, mineral oil, asphalt, wood, coal, nickel, meat and railway vehicles. 

Canada is the 24th largest trade partner of Taiwan, which exported to Canada over $1.5bn worth of goods and services in 2017–18, ranking it 19th on the Canadian list. The main exports from Taiwan to Canada were mobile devices, recording equipment, boilers, steel products, and plastic products.

In 2018, the balance of trade between Taiwan and Canada in 2018 was 47.9 billion Canadian dollars in favour of the Taiwanese.

As the Canadian difficulties with China mounted in 2019, academics like Hugh Stephens suggested that the Taiwanese relationship be fostered and promoted, which he saw as being consistent with Canada's democratic values. He would encourage the accession of Taiwan to the CPTPP, and noted that Taiwanese membership with the WTO allowed New Zealand to sign an FTA with Taiwan in 2013.

In October 2019 it was remarked that the number of foreign diplomatic ties of Taiwan had dwindled to 15 countries, Canada not among them.

Taiwanfest 
Taiwanfest began in 1990 in Vancouver by musical/cultural magnate Cecilia Chueh as a music festival but expanded to include various cultural events. From 2006 onwards, it is also expanded and celebrated in Toronto.

See also

 Canada–China relations
 Taiwanese Canadians

References

External links 
Canada and Taiwan - international.gc.ca

 
Taiwan
Bilateral relations of Taiwan